Mirbelia oxylobioides, commonly known as mountain mirbelia or sandstone bushpea, is a species of flowering plant in the family Fabaceae and is endemic to south-eastern Australia. It is a low-lying or erect shrub with narrowly elliptic to egg-shaped leaves and orange-yellow and reddish-purple flowers arranged near the end of the branches.

Description

Taxonomy
Mirbelia oxylobioides was first formally described by botanist Ferdinand von Mueller in Fragmenta Phytographiae Australiae in 1861. The specific epithet (oxylobioides) means "Oxylobium-like".

Distribution and habitat
Mountain mirbelia grows in shrubby woodland in mountainous country in south-eastern New South Wales, eastern Victoria and near Elderslie in Tasmania.

Conservation status
In Tasmania, sandstone bushpea is only found in the Heathy Hills Nature Reserve near Elderslie and is classified as "vulnerable" under Tasmania's Threatened Species Protection Act 1995. It is threatened by the effects of drought and by the invasion of gorse.

References

Mirbelioids
oxylobioides
Fabales of Australia
Flora of New South Wales
Flora of Victoria (Australia)
Flora of Tasmania
Taxa named by Ferdinand von Mueller
Plants described in 1861